Hywel ap Syr Mathew (died 1581) was a Welsh poet, genealogist and soldier.

He originated from Radnorshire in the valley of the River Teme at Llanfair Waterdine.

Poetry 
Hywel ap Syr Mathew composed many cywyddau written to among others, Bishop Richard Davies, William Herbert, Earl of Pembroke, Mathew ap Moris of Ceri (Kerry, Powys), Siencyn ap Dafydd of Llanarthney and an awdl to Lewys Gwyn of Glyn Nedd, Glynneath near Neath.

His poems survive in several medieval Welsh manuscripts.

Soldier 
He was present at the Siege of Boulogne in 1544–1546.

Welsh genealogist 
Hywel ap Syr Mathew also composed Welsh genealogical manuscripts and detailed pedigrees, some used later by other students such as Lewys Dwnn.

External links 
The National Library of Wales Dictionary of Welsh Biography on Hywel ap Syr Mathew

Welsh soldiers
Year of birth missing
1581 deaths
Welsh genealogists
16th-century Welsh poets
16th-century soldiers
People from Radnorshire